The year 1718 in architecture involved some significant events.

Buildings and structures

Buildings
 In Pascagoula, Mississippi, the Old Spanish Fort is built.
 In Bengal, the mazar of Saint Shah Sultan Mahi Swar Balkhi is built, a single domed mosque.
 In Bavaria, Schloss Weißenstein is completed to the designs of Johann Dientzenhofer and Johann Lukas von Hildebrandt.
 In London, St Alfege Church, Greenwich, rebuilt by Nicholas Hawksmoor, is consecrated, the first completed work of the Commission for Building Fifty New Churches.
 The church of Santa Cristina, Turin, is completed under guidance of Filippo Juvarra.
 Temple in Shotover Park, Oxfordshire, an early example of Gothic Revival architecture in England.
 Willmer House in Farnham, England, a noted example of brick building.

Births
 February – John Vardy, English neo-Palladian architect (died 1765)
 March 21 – Friedrich August Krubsacius, Dresden architect (died 1789)
 May 14 – Mario Gioffredo, Neapolitan architect, engineer and engraver (died 1785)

Deaths
 September 11 – Domenico Martinelli, Italian baroque architect (born 1650)

architecture
Years in architecture
18th-century architecture